Alresford railway station is on the Sunshine Coast Line, a branch of the Great Eastern Main Line, in the East of England, serving the village of Alresford, Essex. In official literature it is shown as Alresford (Essex) in order to distinguish it from the station of the same name in Hampshire. Its three-letter station code is ALR.

The station was opened by the Tendring Hundred Railway, a subsidiary of the Great Eastern Railway, in 1866. It is currently managed by Greater Anglia, which also operates all trains serving the station.

History

The station was opened on 8 January 1866 by the Tendring Hundred Railway, then owned by the Great Eastern Railway. It later became part of the London and North Eastern Railway following the Grouping of 1923, and then passed to the Eastern Region of British Railways upon nationalisation in 1948. After sectorisation was introduced, the station was served by Network SouthEast until the privatisation of British Rail.

Prior to the electrification of the line, the ticket clerk operated the level crossing gates, the home and distant signals on both the "up" (London-bound) and "down" (country-bound) lines, and his own level crossing gate lock and the one for the level crossing a short distance down the line, at all times that the signal box was unmanned. Edward Burbage fulfilled this duty for nearly 50 years. The crossing gates were replaced with automatic barriers as part of an upgrade of the line in 2008 and 2009.

Tickets are sold from a machine in Station Road as the original station building has been disused for many years but has been maintained by volunteers. In 2016 it was reported that the line franchisee, Abellio Greater Anglia, planned to demolish the station building and provide platform shelters in its place. The buildings were subsequently offered to Tendring District Council for £1 each, should the council wish to renovate them.

Services
The typical off-peak service pattern is:

At peak times there are some additional services that are extended Walton-on-the-Naze services to London Liverpool Street or Clacton-on-Sea services stopping here

References 

 
 
 Station on navigable O.S. map

External links

Railway stations in Essex
DfT Category E stations
Former Great Eastern Railway stations
Greater Anglia franchise railway stations
Railway stations in Great Britain opened in 1866
Tendring